Richard Yates (6 June 1921 – 1976) was a Welsh footballer who spent six years immediately after World War II playing centre-forward in the Football League for Chester, Wrexham, Carlisle United, and  New Brighton.

Career
Yates played as a guest for Wrexham, Reading, Charlton Athletic and Port Vale during World War II. After the war he signed with Frank Brown's Chester, and with 36 goals in the 1946–47 season he set a club record that was never equalled. Despite his efforts, the "Seals" could only finish third in the Third Division North, and were not promoted. He left Sealand Road in the 1947–48 season and scored 18 goals in 31 league games for Wrexham, who also finished third in the Third Division North. He departed the Racecourse Ground, and switched to league rivals Carlisle United. He scored nine goals in 16 league games in the 1948–49 campaign for Ivor Broadis's "Cumbrians", in what was a brief stay at Brunton Park. He moved on to New Brighton for the 1949–50 season, before leaving the club after they failed to gain re-election in 1950–51. Despite boasting a goal ratio of one goal for every two games, he never found another club in the Football League, and instead ended his career with South Liverpool.

Career statistics
Source:

References

People from Queensferry, Flintshire
Sportspeople from Flintshire
Welsh footballers
Association football forwards
Chester City F.C. players
Wrexham F.C. wartime guest players
Reading F.C. wartime guest players
Charlton Athletic F.C. wartime guest players
Port Vale F.C. wartime guest players
Wrexham A.F.C. players
Carlisle United F.C. players
New Brighton A.F.C. players
South Liverpool F.C. players
English Football League players
1921 births
1976 deaths